The University of Denver Water Law Review is a law journal focused on ideas, information, and legal and policy analyses concerning water law. Launched in 1997, it is published by students at the Sturm College of Law at the University of Denver in Colorado.

Overview 
The Water Law Review publishes two issues each year and contains articles, case notes, book reviews, case summaries and legislative updates written by lawyers, academics, and students. The review also provides an online supplement discussing the legal and policy implications of current events. Additionally, the review hosts an annual "Water Law Symposium" in the spring.

References 

Law journals